Uncial 0298 (in the Gregory-Aland numbering), is a Greek-Coptic uncial manuscript of the New Testament. Palaeographically it has been assigned to the 8th or 9th century.

Description 

The codex contains a small parts of the Gospel of Matthew 26:24-29 in Greek and Matthew 26:17-21 in Coptic (Sahidic dialect), on 1 parchment leaf. The text is written in one column per page, 19 lines per page, in uncial letters.

Currently it is dated by the INTF to the 8th or 9th century.

It is a palimpsest, the lower text is in Latin, it was written in the 5th century. 

The text of the manuscript was published by Ramón Roca-Puig in 1985.

Location 
Formerly the codex was housed at the Fundación Sant Lluc Evangelista (P. Barc., inv. n. 4) in Barcelona. Currently it is housed at the Abadia de Montserrat (P. Monts. Roca inv. no. 4).

See also 

 List of New Testament uncials
 Coptic versions of the Bible
 Biblical manuscripts
 Textual criticism

References

Further reading 

  

Greek New Testament uncials
Greek-Coptic diglot manuscripts of the New Testament 
8th-century biblical manuscripts 
Palimpsests